Parliamentary elections were held in Sri Lanka on 21 July 1977. The result was a landslide victory for the United National Party, which won 140 of the 168 seats in the National State Assembly.

Background
Prime Minister Sirimavo Bandaranaike had become extraordinarily unpopular.  Her economic policies had led to industrial growth and self-reliance, but were insufficient to overcome unemployment.  Constitutionally, she had taken advantage of the 1972 constitution to delay the election until 1977, instead of 1975 as would have been the case under the old Soulbury constitution.  The government's strong Sinhala nationalist stance had led to unrest in the Tamil north; in response, an island-wide state of emergency was imposed, causing hardship to many people.  The UF coalition Bandaranaike had built for the 1970 elections had disintegrated.

By contrast, the United National Party had made a surprising comeback since its 1970 humiliation.  Under the leadership of J.R. Jayewardene it had assiduously built up its ground organization.  The UNP promised to solve the ethnic problem with a devolution package.  Economically, it proposed opening up the Sri Lankan economy again.  Constitutionally, the UNP called for replacing the Westminster-based political system with one modelled along French lines. Most importantly, it promised a free extra ration of eight pounds of cereal (the so-called eta ata), on top of the existing ration of two kilograms of rice.

More portentous was the status of the Tamil parties.  The old federalist Tamil parties had merged to form the Tamil United Liberation Front, led by Appapillai Amirthalingam, which had gone beyond regional autonomy to openly call for independence of the Tamil-speaking regions of the country.

Results
The UNP won the largest landslide in Sri Lankan history, taking over half the vote and 140 of the 168 seats, five-sixths of the legislature. The size of the landslide was magnified by the first-past-the-post system. The SLFP was decimated, falling from 91 seats to only eight–easily the worst defeat that a Sri Lankan governing party has ever suffered, and one of the worst ever suffered by a governing party in a Westminster system.

For the first time, a Tamil party won the second-highest number of seats in Parliament and became the Official Opposition.

Abeyratne Pilapitiya of the UNP was elected MP for Kalawana, but was subsequently unseated in an election petition. Sarath Muttetuwegama of the Communist Party was returned to Parliament in the ensuing by-election.

The 1977 election was the only one ever held under the 1972 constitution. A year later, the UNP-dominated legislature amended the constitution to replace the parliamentary system with a presidential system. Under the provisions of the new document, Prime Minister Jayewardene became president on 4 February 1978.

Electorate Results

Western Province

Colombo District

Gampaha District

Kalutara District

Central Province

Matale District

Kandy District

Nuwaraeliya District

Southern Province

Galle District

Matara District

Hambantota District

Northern Province

Jaffna District

Vanni District

Eastern Province

Trincomalee District

Batticalao District

Ampara District

North Western Province

Puttalam District

Kurunegala District

North Central Province

Anuradapura District

Polonnaruwa District

Uva Province

Badulla District

Monaragala District

Sabaragamuwa Province

Kegalle District

Ratnapura District 

 Source

Notes

References

 
 
 
 
 

 
Sri Lanka
Parliamentary elections in Sri Lanka
Sri Lanka
Election and referendum articles with incomplete results